Spate is a surname, and may refer to:

 Clive Spate (born 1952), British game show contestant
 Oskar Spate (1911–2000), geographer
 Virginia Spate (1937–2022), Australian art historian
 Ute Späte (born 1961), German chess master

Spate may also refer to a flood.

See also

 Pate (disambiguation)
 Spade (disambiguation)
 Spat (disambiguation)